Bogićevica is a mountain area in the Accursed Mountains mountain range. It spreads over Albania, Montenegro and Kosovo. Marijash and Maja e Ropës are both located in Kosovo. The towns of Deçan in Kosovo and Tropojë in Albania are located near the area.

Peaks
Marijaš - 
Rops - 
Pasji Peak - 
Bogićaj - 
Krš Bogićevica - 
Pčelin krš - 
Tromeđa - 
Hridski krš - 
Maja e Ram Arucit - 
Mali Pasji vrh (Small Pasji Peak) - 
Ujkov krš - 
Velika Kleka - 
Maja e Špalit - 
Kožnjar - 
Mali Hrid - 
Veliki Hrid -

Notes and references
Notes:

References:

Bogićevica/Bogiçevica at summitpost.org

Mountains of Albania
Mountains of Kosovo
Mountains of Montenegro
Accursed Mountains
International mountains of Europe
Albania–Kosovo border
Geography of Kukës County